Lampasas is a city in Lampasas County, Texas, United States. Its population was 7,291 at the 2020 census. It is the seat of Lampasas County.

Lampasas is part of the Killeen–Temple–Fort Hood metropolitan statistical area.

History
For his services in the Texas Revolution, John Burleson received  of land and established a permanent settlement in the 1850s.  The city was first named Burleson, but the name was gradually changed to Lampasas Springs because of the existence of seven mineral springs. When the county was created in 1856, the law specified "The county seat shall be same name as the county."   The city of Lampasas was officially incorporated in 1883.

Several theories attempt to explain how the name Lampasas came to be.  The Texas Almanac states the word came from a Spanish word for "lilies" found in nearby streams.  Another source states the word comes from the Spanish name Lampazos.  The name was given to the local river by the Spanish Aquayo Expedition in 1721.  It is believed the name was inspired by a Mexican town that also had beautiful springs.  The town was also the location of the birth of the Farmers' Alliance, founded in 1876.

In the Mother's Day Flood of 1957, Sulphur Creek, a local river, struck the city in devastating flash flood that claimed five lives and destroyed many homes, businesses, and other property around downtown Lampasas. In the aftermath, a series of levees and reservoirs was constructed to prevent damage from future catastrophes.

Since 1972, Lampasas has held an annual fair called the Spring Ho festival each July.

Geography

Lampasas is located at  (31.065868, –98.183444).

The most notable waterway is Sulphur Creek, which flows from the southwest to the northeast through the south-central part of the city.

Climate
The climate in this area is characterized by hot, humid summers and generally mild to cool winters.  According to the Köppen climate classification, Lampasas has a humid subtropical climate, Cfa.

Demographics

2020 census

As of the 2020 United States census, there were 7,291 people, 2,900 households, and 1,782 families wereresiding in the city. The population density was 1,097.3 people per square mile (424.0/km).

Of the 2,554 households, 33.7% had children under 18 living with them, 48.4% were married couples living together, 13.9% had a female householder with no husband present, and 33.0% were not families. About 29.5% of all households were made up of individuals, and 16.1% had someone living alone who was 65 years of age or older. The average household size was 2.54, and the average family size was 3.13.

In the city, the population was distributed as 27.6% under the age of 18, 8.2% from 18 to 24, 25.2% from 25 to 44, 20.2% from 45 to 64, and 18.8% who were 65 or older. The median age was 36 years. For every 100 females, there were 88.9 males. For every 100 females 18 and over, there were 84.0 males.

The median income for a household in the city was $27,898, and for a family was $31,012. Males had a median income of $26,606 versus $19,959 for females. The per capita income for the city was $13,409. About 18.3% of families and 21.1% of the population were below the poverty line, including 28.5% of those under age 18 and 16.9% of those age 65 or over.

Notable people
The Horrell brothers, outlaws of the Old West
John Wesley "Lam" Jones, former sprinter (gold medal at the 1976 Summer Olympics) and NFL football player
Dale McBride, country singer, songwriter
Terry McBride (McBride and the Ride), country singer, songwriter, son of Dale McBride
Keith Null, former American football quarterback
Stanley Walker, editor of New York Herald Tribune from 1928 to 1935

Education
The city of Lampasas is served by the Lampasas Independent School District.

References in pop culture
Lampasas is mentioned in the Hank Williams, Jr.-penned and recorded song "Texas Women".

"Lampasas, Texas" is the title of the second episode of the CBS Western television series Trackdown, starring Robert Culp as Texas Ranger Hoby Gilman. The episode aired on October 11, 1957. In the story line, Gilman tries to block a town from carrying out the legal lynching of an innocent man.

Lampasas is mentioned in Canadian singer Ian Tyson's song "Bob Fudge". In 2019, fellow Canadian singer Colter Wall released a cover of "Bob Fudge".

References

External links

 
 Lampasas County Chamber of Commerce

Cities in Texas
Cities in Lampasas County, Texas
County seats in Texas
Killeen–Temple–Fort Hood metropolitan area